Chaos Theory: Part 1 is the second extended play from New Zealand hard rock band Like A Storm. Written and recorded while the band was on a nationwide American tour, early pre-sales of the album began in November, 2012. Most recently, Chaos Theory: Part 1 was released in New Zealand, through Warner Music.

Chaos Theory: Part 1 features a range of instruments in addition to the traditional hard rock sound - including didgeridoo, djembe, piano, synthesizers, choirs and programming. The album has spawned two New Zealand and American rock radio singles - "Never Surrender" and "Love the Way You Hate Me". The single, "Love the Way You Hate Me", hit No. 6 on the New Zealand Rock Charts.

Produced by Kent, Chris and Matt Brooks, the album was mixed by Elvis Baskette and mastered by Brad Blackwood.

Track listing
 "Six Feet Under" 
 "Never Surrender" 
 "Gangster's Paradise" (Coolio cover)
 "Break Free" 
 "Love the Way You Hate Me" 
 "Southern Skies" 
 "Nothing Remains (Nihil Reliquum)"

Personnel
Chris Brooks - lead vocals, guitar, didgeridoo, programming and keys
Matt Brooks - lead vocals, guitar, programming and keys, percussion 
Kent Brooks - bass, vocals, guitar, programming and keys

Additional personnel
Roye Robley - drums

References

2012 albums
Like a Storm albums